The Shadegan oil field is an Iranian oil field located in Khuzestan Province, in the south west of Ahvaz City. It was discovered in 1968 and the production was started in 1988. The field has 23 km in length 6 km in width and includes two reservoirs. The field is owned by National Iranian Oil Company (NIOC) and operated by National Iranian South Oil Company (NISOC).

See also

List of oil fields

References

Oil fields of Iran